{{speciesbox
| name = Mastigodryas boddapoo"
| image = Mastigodryas boddaerti02.jpg
| status = LC
| status_system = IUCN3.1
| status_ref = 
| genus = Mastigodryas
| species = boddaerti
| authority = (Sentzen, 1796)
| synonyms = *Coluber boddaertii Herpetodryas boddaertii Drymobius boddaertii Eudryas boddaertii Dryadophis boddaerti Mastigodryas boddaerti 
| synonyms_ref =
}}Mastigodryas boddaerti, commonly known as Boddaert's tropical racer, is a species of snake in the family Colubridae. The species is native to tropical South America including Trinidad and Tobago.

DistributionM. boddaerti occurs in Bolivia, Brazil, Colombia, Ecuador, French Guiana, Guyana, Peru, Trinidad and Tobago, and Venezuela.

Habitat

DescriptionM. boddaerti changes coloration ontogenetically. Juveniles from Guyana have a brown dorsum with grayish tan bands, with white spots ventrolaterally on anterior ends of the tan bands. The chin and throat are white, with dark brown irregular spots. The venter is tan-colored. Adults are nearly uniform brown dorsally, with traces of bands anteriorly. There is a lateral light tan stripe on the anterior half of the body. The venter is light gray with darker gray smudges on the throat.

BehaviorM. boddaerti is diurnal and mainly terrestrial, but it will occasionally climb low vegetation.

DietM. boddaerti feeds on young birds, frogs, lizards, and mice.https://sta.uwi.edu/fst/lifesciences/sites/default/files/lifesciences/documents/ogatt/Mastigodryas_boddaerti%20-%20Neotropical%20Racer.pdf Specimens from Brazilian Amazonas fed mostly on lizards, followed by mammals and frogs.

ReproductionM. boddaerti is oviparous.

Subspecies
Three subspecies are recognized, including the nominotypical subspecies.Mastigodryas boddaerti boddaerti Mastigodryas boddaerti dunni Mastigodryas boddaerti ruthveni 

Etymology
The specific name, boddaerti, is in honor of Dutch naturalist Pieter Boddaert. The subspecific names, dunni and ruthveni, are in honor of American herpetologists Emmett Reid Dunn and Alexander G. Ruthven, respectively.

References

Further reading
Freiberg M (1982). Snakes of South America. Hong Kong: T.F.H. Publications. 189 pp. . (Mastigodryas boddaerti, p. 104).
Oliveira EA, Hernández-Ruz EJ, Carvalho JC, Ferreira Santana MD, Silva LW, Araújo KR (2013). "Mastigodryas boddaerti (Boddaert's tropical racer). Reproduction". Herpetological Review 44 (2): 332.
Sentzen UJ (1796). "Ophiologische Fragmente ". Zoologische Archiv [part 2]. Leipzig: F.A.A. Meyer. (Coluber boddaertii, new species, pp. 59, 66). (in German).
Stuart LC (1933). "Studies on Neotropical Colubrinae:  II. Some New Species and Subspecies of Eudryas Fitzinger, with an Annotated List of the Forms of Eudryas boddaertii (Sentzen)". Occasional Papers of the Museum of Zoology, University of Michigan'' (254): 1-10.

External links
https://serpientesdevenezuela.org/mastigodryas-boddaerti/ (in Spanish).

Colubrids
Snakes of South America
Reptiles of Bolivia
Reptiles of Brazil
Reptiles of Colombia
Reptiles of Ecuador
Reptiles of French Guiana
Reptiles of Guyana
Reptiles of Peru
Reptiles of Trinidad and Tobago
Reptiles of Venezuela
Reptiles described in 1796